The Space Kidettes is an American Saturday morning animated television series produced by Hanna-Barbera Productions, originally airing on NBC during the 1966–67 season. In the show, junior rangers Snoopy, Jenny, Countdown and Scooter patrol the cosmos from their space-capsule clubhouse, with help from their dog Pupstar. Twenty episodes were produced.

Plot
Set in outer space, the series followed the adventures of a group of child astronauts, who have acquired a treasure map and have to keep it away from their space pirate nemesis Captain Skyhook and his sidekick Static.

Episodes
 Molemen Menace
 Jet Set Go
 Space Indians
 Swamp-Swamped
 Space Heroes
 Space Witch
 Tale of a Whale
 Space Giant
 Space Carnival
 The Laser-Breathing Space Dragon
 The Flight Before Christmas
 Beach Brawl
 Dog-napped in Space
 Secret Solar Robot
 King of the Space Pirates
 Planet of Greeps
 Cosmic Condors
 The Space Mermaid
 Haunted Planet
 Something Old, Something Gnu

Voice cast
 Chris Allen - Scooter
 Lucille Bliss - Snoopy
 Daws Butler - Captain Skyhook
 Don Messick - Countdown, Pupstar, Static
 Janet Waldo - Jenny

Production
Originally airing for one season on NBC as a half-hour program and sponsored by General Mills, The Space Kidettes episodes were later edited down to ten-minute episodes and paired with other General Mills-sponsored shows such as Tennessee Tuxedo and Go Go Gophers to form a full half-hour for syndication.

Edited further, it was later paired with edited reruns of cartoons from another NBC Hanna-Barbera program, (Young) Samson & Goliath to form the syndication package The Space Kidettes and Young Samson. The original master elements for both programs were lost, leaving the syndicated edits as the only extant broadcast quality versions.

All 20 episodes of The Space Kidettes and Young Samson were released on DVD via the Warner Archive Collection manufacture-on-demand program in 2011.

See also
List of works produced by Hanna-Barbera Productions
List of Hanna-Barbera characters

References

External links
 The Space Kidettes at Don Markstein's Toonopedia. Archived from the original on July 23, 2017.

1960s American animated television series
1966 American television series debuts
1967 American television series endings
American children's animated science fiction television series
American children's animated space adventure television series
Animated television series about children
English-language television shows
NBC original programming
Television series by Hanna-Barbera
Television series set in outer space
Television series about astronauts
Television series about pirates